Joseph Geisinger is an American sound engineer. He was nominated for an Academy Award in the category Best Sound Mixing for the film Spider-Man 2. He has worked on over 50 films since 1980.

Selected filmography
 Spider-Man 2 (2004)

References

External links

Year of birth missing (living people)
Living people
American audio engineers